White Memorial Building may refer to:
 White Memorial Building (Houlton, Maine), listed on the NRHP in Maine
 White Memorial Building (Syracuse, New York), listed on the NRHP